Frederic Austin did not assign opus numbers to any of his music. His published output (apart from The Beggar's Opera, Polly and Perviligium Veneris) consists mainly of song settings for solo voice or chorus, while most of his major orchestral and other works remain in manuscript (see the 'MS' column).  Most of Austin's works can be accurately dated, though some (mostly lacking an extant MS) are undated: see the 'Year' column.

List

Popular songs by Fred Austin

A number of popular and novelty songs with music by a certain "Fred Austin" were published by the Lawrence Wright Music Co. during Frederic Austin's lifetime. They include:

 I do like a Lancashire cocktail
 I'm going back to Himazas
 It’s nice to be home again
 Our heroic family (as sung by Jay Laurier)
 Some girls (are nicer than others) (as sung by Jack Lane)

Notes

Sources
 Lee-Browne, Martin (1999), Nothing So Charming As Musick! London: Thames Publishing 
 Gänzl, Kurt: British Musical Theatre, vol. 2 (1915–1984), Oxford: Oxford University Press

External links
Undercover at IMDb

Austin, Frederic